Hydrometra australis is a species of water measurer in the family Hydrometridae. It is found in the Caribbean Sea, Central America, and North America.

References

Further reading

 
 

Hydrometroidea
Articles created by Qbugbot
Insects described in 1832